HaDugmaniot is an Israeli reality documentary based on Tyra Banks' America's Next Top Model and is aired on Channel 10. The show pits contestants against each other in a variety of competitions to determine who will win a modelling contract and other prizes in hopes of a promising career start in the modeling industry.

Judges

History
The show is hosted by Galit Gutmann, one of Israel's leading models. The biggest difference between HaDugmaniyot and ANTM is the live finale aired as the end of each season where two already eliminated contestants get voted back into the top 5. Season 1 the contestants that were voted back were Viktoriya Katzman and Ines Chalif. Season 2 was Alisia Estrin and Natali Sabag. Season 3 was Tslil Sela and Rita Avas. Another difference is the audience choosing the winner of the show unlike in former eliminations, which are all based solely on the panel of judges' decision.

Arab-Israeli Niral Karantinji won the second installment of the show.  During the show, Karantinji  argued with a fellow competitor, Ethiopian-Israeli Mimi Tedessa, who called her "a terrorist." In the end, the audience choose Karantinji as the winner of the series, while Tedessa achieved the second runner-up position.

Cycles

See also
Israeli fashion
Television in Israel

References

External links
Official website 
Music Video by the Contestants of Season 2

~
2005 Israeli television series debuts
2008 Israeli television series endings
Israeli reality television series
Channel 10 (Israeli TV channel) original programming
2000s Israeli television series
Israeli television series based on American television series